Karawa may refer to:

Garawa language
Karawa, Central African Republic
Qarawat Bani Hassan
Qarawat Bani Zeid